Trojan or Trojans may refer to:

 Of or from the ancient city of Troy
 Trojan language, the language of the historical Trojans

Arts and entertainment

Music 
 Les Troyens ('The Trojans'), an opera by Berlioz, premiered part 1863, part 1890
 The Trojan, a 1950s Jamaican sound system led by Duke Reid
 Trojan Records, a British record label, founded in 1968
 "Trojans" (The Damned song), a song by The Damned on their 1985 album Phantasmagoria
 Trojans (EP), by Atlas Genius, 2013

Other uses in arts and entertainment
 Trojan (video game), 1986
 Trojan, a 1991 novel by James Follett
  Troy, a 2004 historical war drama
 "Trojan" (Red Dwarf), a 2012 episode of the TV comedy

People
 Trojan (surname), including a list of people with the name

Places
 Trojan, Gauteng, South Africa
 Trojan, South Dakota U.S.
 Trojan (mountain), on the border of Albania and Montenegro
 Trojan Peak, a mountain in California

Transportation and military 
 GWR No. 1340 Trojan, a British locomotive, built in 1897
 Trojan (automobile), a former British vehicle manufacturer (1914–1965)
 Trojan, a Saltwood Miniature Railway locomotive, used from 1928 to 1970
 AL-60F-5 Trojan, a variant of the Aermacchi AL-60 aircraft (1950s–60s)
 Trojan Armoured Vehicle Royal Engineers, a British combat engineering vehicle (in service since 2007)
 North American T-28 Trojan, an American military trainer aircraft (1950s)

Other uses 
 several sports teams named Trojans
 Trojan (brand), American condoms
 Trojan (celestial body), that shares the orbit of a larger one
 Trojan horse (computing), or trojan, computer malware
 Trojan Nuclear Power Plant, in Oregon, U.S.
 Trojans, a group of scholars in the Grammarians' War in England 1519–1521
 Trojan–Tauranac Racing, a Formula One constructor

See also 
 The Trojan Women (Τρῳάδες, Trōiades, 415 BC), a play by Euripides
 The Trojan Women (film), 1971
 Tommy Trojan, a statue at the University of Southern California
 Troian (disambiguation)
 Trojan Horse (disambiguation)
 Trojan skinhead, a British cultural identity 
 Troyan (disambiguation)
 
 

Language and nationality disambiguation pages